The Stranded is an American comic series created by Virgin Comics, and published by Diamond Comics.

The series is in collaboration with the Sci-Fi Channel. It was announced that The Stranded was being fast-tracked into a pilot for the Sci-Fi Channel, with the pilot to be written by comics series writer Mike Carey. This does not seem to have been realized.

The series is illustrated by artist Siddharth Kotian, and revolves around several aliens who are stranded on earth, as others from their planet arrive.

See also
 Indian comics

References

External links
 The Stranded at Virgin Comics Homepage

2007 comics debuts
Virgin Comics titles